Juramaia is an extinct genus of very basal eutherian mammal known from the Late Jurassic (Oxfordian stage) deposits of western Liaoning, China. It is a small shrew-like mammal with a body length of approximately 70–100 mm, making it similar in size to the modern De Winton's shrew. Juramaia is known from the holotype BMNH PM1343, an articulated and nearly complete skeleton including incomplete skull preserved with full dentition.

Discovery
It was first named by Zhe-Xi Luo, Chong-Xi Yuan, Qing-Jin Meng and Qiang Ji in 2011 and the type species is Juramaia sinensis.

Evolution
The discovery of Juramaia provides new insight into the evolution of placental mammals by showing that their lineage diverged from that of the marsupials 35 million years earlier than previously thought.  Furthermore, its discovery fills gaps in the fossil record and helps to calibrate modern, DNA-based methods of dating the evolution.  Based on climbing adaptations found in the forelimb bones, it has been suggested  that the basal stock of Eutheria was arboreal, in a manner resembling that of modern rats.

Classification

See also 
 Eomaia

References

External links
 'Jurassic Mother' Found in China: Discovery News
 Juramaia sinensis - 160-Million-Year-Old Fossil Pushes Back Mammal Evolution
 Paleobiology Database: Juramaia sinensis

Late Jurassic mammals of Asia
Fossil taxa described in 2011
Prehistoric eutherians
Prehistoric mammal genera